Attili is a village in West Godavari district of the Indian state of Andhra Pradesh. It belongs to Tanuku Constituency in Bhimavaram revenue division. Attili has its own train station. Attili is the headquarters of Attili mandal.

Demographics 

 Census of India, Attili had a population of 25,004. The total population constitutes 12,509 males and 12,495 females with a sex ratio of 999 females per 1,000 males. 2,315 children are in the age group of 0–6 years, with a sex ratio of 928. The average literacy rate stands at 78.82%.

References 

Villages in West Godavari district